This is an incomplete list of Acts of the Parliament of the United Kingdom for the years 1820–1839.  Note that the first parliament of the United Kingdom was held in 1801; parliaments between 1707 and 1800 were either parliaments of Great Britain or of Ireland).  For Acts passed up until 1707 see List of Acts of the Parliament of England and List of Acts of the Parliament of Scotland.  For Acts passed from 1707 to 1800 see List of Acts of the Parliament of Great Britain.  See also the List of Acts of the Parliament of Ireland.

For Acts of the devolved parliaments and assemblies in the United Kingdom, see the List of Acts of the Scottish Parliament, the List of Acts of the Northern Ireland Assembly, and the List of Acts and Measures of the National Assembly for Wales; see also the List of Acts of the Parliament of Northern Ireland.

The number shown after each Act's title is its chapter number. Acts passed before 1963 are cited using this number, preceded by the year(s) of the reign during which the relevant parliamentary session was held; thus the Union with Ireland Act 1800 is cited as "39 & 40 Geo. 3 c. 67", meaning the 67th Act passed during the session that started in the 39th year of the reign of George III and which finished in the 40th year of that reign.  Note that the modern convention is to use Arabic numerals in citations (thus "41 Geo. 3" rather than "41 Geo. III"). Acts of the last session of the Parliament of Great Britain and the first session of the Parliament of the United Kingdom are both cited as "41 Geo. 3".  Acts passed from 1963 onwards are simply cited by calendar year and chapter number.

All modern Acts have a short title, e.g. the Local Government Act 2003.  Some earlier Acts also have a short title given to them by later Acts, such as by the Short Titles Act 1896.

1820 – 1829

1820

60 Geo. 3 & 1 Geo. 4

 Expiring Laws Continuance Act 1820 c 12
 Indemnity Act 1820 c 10
 Local Jurisdictions Act 1820 c 14
 Mutiny Act Continuance Act 1820 c 13
 Parliamentary Elections (Ireland) Act 1820 c 11

1 Geo. 4

 Accounts of Colonial Revenues Act 1820 c 65
 Aliens Act 1820 c 18
 Aliens Act 1820 c 105
 Appointment of Special Constables Act 1820 c 37
 Apportionment Act 1820 c 108
 Appropriation Act 1820 c 111
 Arms (Ireland) Act 1820 c 47
 Army Prize Money Act 1820 c 84
 Assessed Taxes Act 1820 c 73
 Bank Notes Forgery (Scotland) Act 1820 c 92
 Bounty on Linens etc. Act 1820 c 63
 Bringing of Coals etc. to London etc. Act 1820 c 54
 British Fisheries Act 1820 c 103
 Cape of Good Hope etc. Trade Act 1820 c 11
 Capital Punishment Act 1820 c 115
 Capital Punishment Act 1820 c 116
 Caversham Rectory Act 1820 c 114
 Census (Great Britain) Act 1820 c 94
 Civil List Act 1820 c 1
 Clerks of the Peace (Ireland) Act 1820 c 27
 Coasting Trade (Ireland) Act 1820 c 26
 Compensation for Tithes (Ireland) Act 1820 c 40
 Composition for a Crown Debt Act 1820 c 42
 Consolidated Fund Act 1820 c 44
 Coroners' Fees (Ireland) Act 1820 c 28
 Court of Exchequer (England) etc. Act 1820 c 35
 Crown Lands Act 1820 c 71
 Customs Act 1820 c 7
 Customs Act 1820 c 8
 Customs Act 1820 c 45
 Damaged Coffee etc. Act 1820 c 59
 Divorce Bills Evidence Act 1820 c 101
 Donaghadee Harbour Act 1820 c 113
 Dublin Foundling Hospital Act 1820 c 29
 Dublin House of Industry Act 1820 c 49
 Dunleary Harbour Act 1820 c 69
 Duties New South Wales Act 1820 c 62
 Duties on Coal etc. Act 1820 c 67
 Duties on Glass Act 1820 c 16
 Duties on Paper etc. Act 1820 c 58
 Duties on Spirit Licences etc. (Ireland) Act 1820 c 78
 Duties on Spirits etc. (Scotland) Act 1820 c 74
 Duty on Malt (Scotland) Act 1820 c 118
 Duty on Tobacco Act 1820 c 75
 East India Company Act 1820 c 99
 Exchequer Bills Act 1820 c 31
 Exchequer Bills Act 1820 c 110
 Exchequer Chamber (Ireland) Act 1820 c 68
 Flax etc. Manufacture (Great Britain) Act 1820 c 15
 Glebe Exchange Act 1820 c 6
 Gold Plate (Exportation) Act 1820 c 14
 Grant for Erection of Barracks Act 1820 c 104
 Greenland Whale Fisheries Act 1820 c 33
 Greenwich Hospital Livings in Northumberland Act 1820 c 106
 Import Duties etc. (Isle of Man) Act 1820 c 61
 Importation Barbadoes Act 1820 c 32
 Importation etc. Demerara etc. Act 1820 c 34
 Importation etc. Jamaica Act 1820 c 12
 Importation Act 1820 c 52
 Importation Act 1820 c 53
 Indictments Act 1820 c 102
 Insolvent Debtors' Act 1820 c 3. Also called the Insolvent Debtors (England) Act 1820.
 Insolvent Debtors (Ireland) Act 1820 c 97
 Irish Fisheries Act 1820 c 82
 Kings' Bench Justices of Assize Act 1820 c 55
 Licensed Brewers (Ireland) Act 1820 c 79
 Lotteries Act 1820 c 72
 Lunatic Asylums (Ireland) Act 1820 c 98
 Malicious Trespass Act 1820 c 56
 Manufacture of Sail Cloth Act 1820 c 25
 Marine Mutiny Act 1820 c 20
 Militia (City of London) Act 1820 c 100
 Militia Pay (Great Britain) Act 1820 c 86
 Militia Pay (Ireland) Act 1820 c 96
 Mutiny Act 1820 c 19
 National Debt Act 1820 c 13
 National Debt Act 1820 c 17
 National Debt Act 1820 c 22
 National Debt Act 1820 c 23
 Naval Prize Money Act 1820 c 85
 Nisi Prius Act 1820 c 21
 Offences at Sea Act 1820 c 90
 Peace Preservation Act 1820 c 24
 Pensions to George III's Servants etc. Act 1820 c 109
 Police Magistrates Metropolitan Act 1820 c 66
 Poor Law (Appeals) Act 1820 c 36
 Portpatrick Harbour Act 1820 c 112
 Post Horse Duties Act 1820 c 88
 Postage Act 1820 c 89
 Public Works Loans (Ireland) Act 1820 c 81
 Public Works Loans Act 1820 c 60
 Quartering of Soldiers Act 1820 c 38
 Recovery of Possession by Landlords Act 1820 c 87
 Recovery of Tenements (Ireland) Act 1820 c 41
 Relief of Insolvent Debtors Act 1820 c 119. Also called the Insolvent Debtors Act 1820 or the Insolvent Debtors (England) Act 1820.
 Relief of Rutson and Company Act 1820 c 30
 Removal of Slaves Act 1820 c 50
 Rents of the Rolls Estate etc. Act 1820 c 107
 Roads (London to Chirk) Act 1820 c 70
 Royal Marines Act 1820 c 91
 Sale of Spirits (England) Act 1820 c 76
 Savings Banks (England) Act 1820 c 83
 Smuggling etc. Act 1820 c 43
 South Sea Company Act 1820 c 2
 St. John's Newfoundland Act 1820 c 51
 Stage Coaches (Scotland) Act 1820 c 4
 Stealing in Shops etc. Act 1820 c 117
 Sugar etc. Act 1820 c 64
 Sugar Duties (Ireland) Act 1820 c 80
 Supply Act 1820 c 10
 Support of Commercial Credit (Ireland) Act 1820 c 39
 Trade in Spirits Act 1820 c 77
 Transfer of Stock (Ireland) Act 1820 c 5
 Treasury Bills (Ireland) Act 1820 c 46
 Turnpike Road Trusts Act 1820 c 95
 Vessels Built at Malta etc. Act 1820 c 9
 Wages of Artificers etc. Act 1820 c 93
 Whipping Act 1820 c 57
 Yeomanry Corps (Ireland) Act 1820 c 48

1821 (1 & 2 Geo. 4)

 Admiralty Courts (Scotland) Act 1821 c 39
 Appropriation Act 1821 c 122
 Attorneys and Solicitors (Ireland) Act 1821 c 17
 Bank of England Act 1821 c 26
 Bank of Ireland Act 1821 c 27
 Bank of Ireland Act 1821 c 72
 Bankruptcy Court Act 1821 c 115
 Beer Duties Act 1821 c 22
 Bills of Exchange Act 1821 c 78
 British North America Act 1821 c 66
 British Spirits Duty Act 1821 c 96
 Capital Punishment (Ireland) Act 1821 c 34
 Caversham Rectory Act 1821 c 86
 Cinque Ports Act 1821 c 76
 Clerk of Assize (Ireland) Act 1821 c 54
 Coasting Trade (Great Britain) Act 1821 c 97
 Commissariat Accounts Act 1821 c 121
 Common Law Procedure (Ireland) Act 1821 c 53
 Conway Bridge Act 1821 c 35
 County Rates Act 1821 c 85
 Court of King's Bench, Westminster Act 1821 c 16
 Court of Session Act 1821 c 38
 Customs Act 1821 c 37
 Customs Act 1821 c 106
 Customs Act 1821 c 116
 Discovery of Longitude at Sea, etc. Act 1821 c 2
 Exchequer Bills Act 1821 c 71
 Disfranchisement of Grampound Act 1821 c 21
 Disfranchisement of Grampound Act 1821 c 47
 Drawback on Malt Act 1821 c 82
 Drawbacks on Coals, etc. Act 1821 c 67
 Duchy of Lancaster Act 1821 c 52
 Duties on Horses Act 1821 c 20
 Duties on Malt, etc. Act 1821 c 3
 Duties on Tobacco Act 1821 c 109
 Duties on Wood, etc. (Great Britain) Act 1821 c 84
 Duty on Irish Starch Act 1821 c 29
 Duty on Malt Act 1821 c 83
 East India Company Act 1821 c 61
 East India, etc., Trade Act 1821 c 65
 Exchange of Lands of Charities Act 1821 c 92
 Excise Act 1821 c 105
 Exportation Act 1821 c 101
 Exportation Between Great Britain and Ireland Act 1821 c 19
 Exportation, etc. Act 1821 c 102
 Flax, etc., Manufacture Act 1821 c 12
 Foundling Hospital, Dublin Act 1821 c 117
 Frauds by Bankrupts (Ireland) Act 1821 c 40
 Frauds by Boatmen, etc. Act 1821 c 75
 Gaol Fees Abolition (Ireland) Act 1821 c 77
 General Sessions of the Peace (Ireland) Act 1821 c 62
 Glass Duties Act 1821 c 13
 Goods Sold Under Warehousing Acts, 1821 c 103
 Greenwich Hospital Out-pensioners Act 1821 c 98
 Growing Produce of Consolidated Fund Act 1821 c 95
 Hereditary Revenues Act 1821 c 31
 Holyhead Roads Act 1821 c 30
 Hops Act 1821 c 100
 Horse Duties Act 1821 c 110
 House of Commons Disqualifications Act 1821 c 44. Also called the House of Commons (Disqualification) Act 1821.
 Importation Act 1821 c 14
 Importation Act 1821 c 94
 Importation and Exportation Act 1821 c 87
 Importation, Isle of Man Act 1821 c 104
 Importation, Nova Scotia Act 1821 c 7
 Inclosure Act 1821 c 23
 Indemnity Act 1821 c 5
 Indentures of Apprenticeship, etc. Act 1821 c 32
 Insolvent Debtors (Ireland) Act 1821 c 59
 Jurors at Assizes (England) Act 1821 c 46
 Justices of the Peace Act 1821 c 63
 Land Tax Commissioners Act 1821 c 123
 Lands at Gillingham Act 1821 c 107
 London Wharves Act 1821 c 89
 Lotteries Act 1821 c 120
 Lunacy (Ireland) Act 1821 c 33
 Lunatics Act 1821 c 114
 Making, etc., of Bread Act 1821 c 50
 Marine Mutiny Act 1821 c 10
 Militia Pay Act 1821 c 42
 Militia Pay Act 1821 c 43
 Mutiny Act 1821 c 9
 National Debt Act 1821 c 70
 National Debt Act 1821 c 108
 Navy Pay, etc. Act 1821 c 49
 New South Wales Duties Act 1821 c 8
 Ordnance Property Act 1821 c 69
 Parliamentary Elections (Ireland) Act 1821 c 58
 Police Magistrates, Metropolitan Act 1821 c 118
 Prisons (Ireland) Act 1821 c 57
 Proceeds of Captured Slavers Act 1821 c 99
 Property Occupied for Naval Service, etc. Act 1821 c 93
 Provision for Queen Caroline Act 1821 c 1
 Provisions for Duke of Clarence Act 1821 c 119
 Public Coal Yards, Dublin, etc. Act 1821 c 68
 Public Notaries (Ireland) Act 1821 c 36
 Public Works Loans Act 1821 c 111
 Quartering of Soldiers Act 1821 c 25
 Rate of Interest Act 1821 c 51
 Registry of Wool Act 1821 c 81
 Rescue Act 1821 c 88
 Revenue (Ireland) Act 1821 c 90
 Sale of Workhouses Act 1821 c 56
 Silk, etc., Bounties Act 1821 c 91
 Silk Manufacture, etc. Act 1821 c 11
 Solicitors (Ireland) Act 1821 c 48
 South Sea Trade Act 1821 c 60
 Stamp Duties in Law Proceedings (Ireland) Act 1821 c 112
 Stamps Act 1821 c 55
 Steam Engine Furnaces Act 1821 c 41. Sometimes called the Steam Engines Furnaces Act 1821.
 Stocks, etc., of Lunatics Act 1821 c 15
 Supply Act 1821 c 4
 Taxes Act 1821 c 113
 Transfer of Public Funds Act 1821 c 73
 Transportation Act 1821 c 6
 Treason (Ireland) Act 1821 c 24
 Treasurer of the Navy Act 1821 c 74
 Treasury Bills (Ireland) Act 1821 c 80
 Vagrants Act 1821 c 64
 West Africa Act 1821 c 28. Sometimes called the West Coast of Africa Possessions Act 1821.
 Westminster, Improvements at. Act 1821 c 45
 White Herring Fishery (Scotland) Act 1821 c 79
 Witchcraft, etc. (Ireland) Act 1821 c 18

1822 (3 Geo. 4)

Public General Acts
 Advances by Bank of Ireland Act 1822 c 26
 Advances for Relief of Distress (Ireland) Act 1822 c 84
 Aliens Act 1822 c 15
 Aliens Act 1822 c 97
 Appointment of Constables, etc. (Ireland) Act 1822 c 103
 Appropriation Act 1822 c 127
 Arms (Ireland) Act 1822 c 4
 Assessed Taxes Act 1822 c 50
 Assize Commission Act 1822 c 10
 Bankrupt Laws (England) Act 1822 c 81
 Bankrupts Act 1822 c 74
 Bounties on British and Irish Linens Act 1822 c 28
 Bounty to Certain Vessels Act 1822 c 104
 British North America (Trade and Lands) Act 1822 c 119
 Census (Ireland) Act 1822 c 5
 Church Building Act 1822 c 72
 Commissioners of the Admiralty Act 1822 c 19
 Confirmation of Marriages Act 1822 c 75
 Court of Exchequer Act 1822 c 87
 Crown Lands (Ireland) Act 1822 c 63
 Cruel Treatment of Cattle Act 1822 c 71
 Customs Act 1822 c 99
 Dead-weight Annuity Act 1822 c 51
 Drawback on Malt for distilling Act 1822 c 76
 Dublin Foundling Hospital Act 1822 c 35
 Duties and Drawbacks on Leather Act 1822 c 83
 Duties, etc., on Barilla Act 1822 c 109
 Duties in New South Wales Act 1822 c 96
 Duties on Brimstone Act 1822 c 107
 Duties on Coals, etc. Act 1822 c 59
 Duties on Fire Hearths, etc. (Ireland) Act 1822 c 54
 Duties on Malt Act 1822 c 18
 Duties on Malt, etc. Act 1822 c 31
 Duties on Malt, etc. Act 1822 c 94
 Duties on Plain Silk Net or Tulle Act 1822 c 32
 Duties on Salt Act 1822 c 82
 Duties on Stage-coaches, etc. Act 1822 c 95
 Duties on Sugar Act 1822 c 106
 Duties on Sugar, etc. Act 1822 c 6
 Duty on Beer or Bigg Malt Act 1822 c 30
 Duty on Malt (Ireland) Act 1822 c 36
 Employment of the Poor (Ireland) Act 1822 c 34
 Endowed Schools (Ireland) Act 1822 c 79
 Exchequer Bills Act 1822 c 8
 Exchequer Bills Act 1822 c 122
 Excise Licences Act 1822 c 27
 Excise Licences Act 1822 c 67
 Exportation Act 1822 c 90
 Exportation Act 1822 c 111
 Fees in Common Law Courts Act 1822 c 69
 Fees in Office of Lord Register of Scotland Act 1822 c 62
 Fever Hospitals (Ireland) Act 1822 c 21
 Growing Produce of Consolidated Fund Act 1822 c 65
 Habeas Corpus Suspension (Ireland) Act 1822 c 2
 Hard Labour Act 1822 c 114
 Illicit Distillation (Scotland) Act 1822 c 52
 Importation Act 1822 c 60
 Improvements at Westminster Act 1822 c 58
 Indemnity Act 1822 c 12
 Indemnity for Seizing Arms, etc. (Ireland) Act 1822 c 3
 Inquiry into Collection, etc., of Revenue Act 1822 c 37
 Insolvent Debtors (England) Act 1822 c 123
 Insolvent Debtors (Ireland) Act 1822 c 124
 Jurors in Criminal Trials (Scotland) Act 1822 c 85
 Kilmainham and Chelsea Hospitals Act 1822 c 57
 King's Bench (England) Act 1822 c 102
 Land and Assessed Taxes Act 1822 c 88
 Land Tax Commissioners Act 1822 c 14
 Leases of Lands of Duchy of Cornwall Act 1822 c 78
 Leases of Tithes (Ireland) Act 1822 c 125
 Levy of Fines Act 1822 c 46
 Licensing of Ale Houses Act 1822 c 77
 Lotteries Act 1822 c 101
 Manufacture of Scorched Corn, etc. Act 1822 c 53
 Marine Mutiny Act 1822 c 11
 Memorials of Grants of Annuities Act 1822 c 92
 Militia Pay Act 1822 c 120
 Militia Pay Act 1822 c 121
 Mutiny Act 1822 c 13
 National Debt Act 1822 c 17
 National Debt Act 1822 c 61
 National Debt Act 1822 c 66
 National Debt Act 1822 c 68
 National Debt Act 1822 c 73
 National Debt Act 1822 c 89
 National Debt Act 1822 c 93
 National Monument in Scotland Act 1822 c 100
 Navigation and Commerce Act 1822 c 43
 Negotiation of Notes and Bills Act 1822 c 70
 Office of Coroner (Ireland) Act 1822 c 115
 Offices in the Exchequer (Ireland) Act 1822 c 56
 Payment of Creditors (Scotland) Act 1822 c 29
 Police Magistrates, Metropolis Act 1822 c 55
 Postage Act 1822 c 105
 Prisons (Ireland) Act 1822 c 64
 Property Occupied for Barrack Service Act 1822 c 108
 Public Salaries, etc. Act 1822 c 113
 Public Works Loans Act 1822 c 86
 Public Works Loans (Ireland) Act 1822 c 112
 Punishment for Manslaughter, etc. Act 1822 c 38
 Quartering of Soldiers Act 1822 c 20
 Queen Caroline's Servants' Pension Act 1822 c 98
 Rate of Interest Act 1822 c 47
 Receivers of Stolen Goods, etc. Act 1822 c 24
 Reduction of National Debt Act 1822 c 9
 Registry of Deeds (Ireland) Act 1822 c 116
 Repeal of Acts Concerning Importation Act 1822 c 41
 Repeal of Acts Concerning Importation Act 1822 c 42
 Riotous Assemblies (Scotland) Act 1822 c 33
 Royal Burghs (Scotland) Act 1822 c 91
 Sheriffs of Edinburgh and Lanark Act 1822 c 49
 Smuggling Act 1822 c 110
 Solicitor (Ireland) Act 1822 c 16
 Stamps Act 1822 c 117
 Starch and Soap Duties Allowances Act 1822 c 25
 Summary Proceedings Act 1822 c 23
 Supply Act 1822 c 7
 Support of Commercial Credit (Ireland) Act 1822 c 22
 Support of Commercial Credit (Ireland) Act 1822 c 118
 Suppression of Insurrections (Ireland) Act 1822 c 1
 Suppression of Insurrections (Ireland) Act 1822 c 80
 Tonnage Duties Act 1822 c 48
 Trade Act 1822 c 44
 Trade Act 1822 c 45
 Turnpike Roads Act 1822 c 126
 Vagrancy (England) Act 1822 c 40
 Warrants of Attorney Act 1822 c 39

Local Acts
 Barnsley Improvement Act 1822 c. xxv

1823 (4 Geo. 4)

 Additional Places of Worship in the Highlands Act 1823 c 79
 Advances for Building Gaols, etc. (England) Act 1823 c 63
 Annuity to Lord St. Vincent Act 1823 c 92
 Appropriation Act 1823 c 100
 Arms (Ireland) Act 1823 c 14
 Assessed Taxes Act 1823 c 11
 Assessed Taxes Act 1823 c 45
 Benefit of Clergy, etc. Act 1823 c 53
 Benefit of Clergy, etc. Act 1823 c 54
 Burial of Suicide Act 1823 c 52
 Capital Punishments, etc. Act 1823 c 46
 Chancellor of the Exchequer (Ireland) Act 1823 c 7
 Charitable Loan Societies (Ireland) Act 1823 c 32
 Church of Ireland Act 1823 c 86
 Clandestine Marriages Act 1823 c 17
 Commissary Courts (Scotland) Act 1823 c 97
 Compensation for Law Offices (Ireland) Act 1823 c 38
 Composition for Tithes (Ireland) Act 1823 c 99
 Confirmation of Certain Marriages Act 1823 c 5
 Confirmation of Executors (Scotland) Act 1823 c 98
 Countervening Duties of Excise Act 1823 c 30
 County Treasurers (Ireland) Act 1823 c 33
 Court of Chancery (Ireland) Act 1823 c 61
 Court of Exchequer (Ireland) Act 1823 c 70
 Crown Lands Act 1823 c 18
 Cursing and Swearing Act 1823 c 31
 Customs Act 1823 c 39
 Customs Act 1823 c 69
 Customs and Excise Act 1823 c 23
 Customs Duties (Ireland) Act 1823 c 72
 Dead-weight Annuity Act 1823 c 22
 Distribution of Prize Money Act 1823 c 65
 Division of County of Cork Act 1823 c 93
 Duties, etc., on Barilla Act 1823 c 44
 Duties, etc., on Barilla Act 1823 c 57
 Duties on Beer, etc. Act 1823 c 51
 Duties on Horses Act 1823 c 62
 Duties on Servants, etc. (Ireland) Act 1823 c 9
 Duties on Spirits Act 1823 c 94
 Duties on Sugar, etc. Act 1823 c 3
 East India Company's Service Act 1823 c 81
 Exchequer Bills Act 1823 c 4
 Factor Act 1823 c 83
 Gaols Act 1823 c 64
 Holyhead Road Act 1823 c 74
 Importation Act 1823 c 26
 Importation and Exportation Act 1823 c 66
 Importation, etc., in Foreign Vessels Act 1823 c 77
 Indemnity Act 1823 c 1
 Indian Bishops and Courts Act 1823 c 71
 Insurrections, etc. (Ireland) Act 1823 c 58
 Joint Tenancy (Ireland) Act 1823 c 36
 Judgement of Death Act 1823 c 48
 Justice, New South Wales Act 1823 c 96
 Justice of the Peace Act 1823 c 27
 Land at Kew Green, Surrey Act 1823 c 75
 Land Tax Commissioners Act 1823 c 68
 Lascars Act 1823 c 80
 Law Costs (Ireland) Act 1823 c 89
 Levy of Fines Act 1823 c 37
 Linen and Hempen Manufactures (Scotland) Act 1823 c 40
 Linen, etc., Manufactures Act 1823 c 90
 Lotteries Act 1823 c 60
 Male Convicts Act 1823 c 47
 Malicious Injuries to Property (Ireland) Act 1823 c 73
 Marine Mutiny Act 1823 c 12
 Marriage Act 1823 c 76
 Marriages Confirmation Act 1823 c 91
 Marriages Confirmation - St. Petersburg Act 1823 c 67
 Master and Servant Act 1823 c 34
 Merchant Seamen, etc. Act 1823 c 25
 Military Roads, etc. (Scotland) Act 1823 c 56
 Militia (Ireland) Act 1823 c 28
 Militia Pay Act 1823 c 59
 Mutiny Act 1823 c 13
 National Debt Reduction Act 1823 c 19
 (For the New South Wales Act 1823, see Justice, New South Wales Act 1823, above)
 Parliamentary Elections (Ireland) Act 1823 c 55
 Passenger Vessels Act 1823 c 84
 Passenger Vessels Act 1823 c 88
 Payment of Creditors (Scotland) Act 1823 c 8
 Powers of Justices as to Apprenticeships Act 1823 c 29
 Process in Courts of Law, etc. (Scotland) Act 1823 c 85
 Quartering of Soldiers Act 1823 c 20
 Rebuilding of London Bridge Act 1823 c 50
 Registering of Vessels Act 1823 c 41
 Roads in Lanarkshire, etc. Act 1823 c 10
 Salaries of County Officers (Ireland) Act 1823 c 43
 Stamp Duties (Court of Chancery (Ireland)) Act 1823 c 78
 Statutory Commissioners Act 1823 c 35
 Supply Act 1823 c 6
 Supply Act 1823 c 21
 Support of Commercial Credit (Ireland) Act 1823 c 42
 Temporary Removal of Convicts Act 1823 c 82
 Trade, American Colonies and West Indies Act 1823 c 2
 Turnpike Roads Act 1823 c 95
 Turnpike Roads (Tolls on Lime) Act 1823 c 16
 Turnpike Roads (Scotland) Act 1823 c 49
 Unlawful Oaths (Ireland) Act 1823 c 87
 Warehousing of Goods Act 1823 c 24
 Yeomanry Corps (Ireland) Act 1823 c 15

1824 (5 Geo. 4)

 Aliens Act 1824 c 37
 Appropriation Act 1824 c 115
 Artificers Going Abroad Act 1824 c 97
 Australian Agricultural Company Act 1824 c 86
 Bankruptcy (England) Act 1824 c 98
 Barrack Property Act 1824 c 26
 Board of Works (Ireland) Act 1824 c 23
 Boundaries, etc., of Countries (Ireland) Act 1824 c 112
 Bray and Kilternan Parishes Act 1824 c 81
 British Museum Act 1824 c 39
 British Museum (No. 2) Act 1824 c 60
 Burial (Ireland) Act 1824 c 25
 Charity Commission Act 1824 c 58
 Chelsea Hospital Act 1824 c 107
 Church Building Act 1824 c 103
 Church of Scotland Act 1824 c 90
 Church Lands Act 1824 c 8
 Church of Ireland Act 1824 c 91
 Clerk of the Parliaments Act 1824 c 82
 Coal Duties, etc. Act 1824 c 43
 Combination of Workmen Act 1824 c 95
 Composition for Tithes (Ireland) Act 1824 c 63
 Connor Tithes Act 1824 c 80
 Constables (Ireland) Act 1824 c 28
 Conveyance by Post of Bank Notes, etc. Act 1824 c 20
 County Treasurers (Ireland) Act 1824 c 29
 Court of Exchequer (Ireland) Act 1824 c 16
 Court of Great Sessions (Wales) Act 1824 c 106
 Crown Debts Act 1824 c 111
 Crown Lands Act 1824 c 48
 Customs Act 1824 c 70
 Distilleries (Scotland) Act 1824 c 56
 Docks, Kingston upon Hull Act 1824 c 52
 Dublin Justices Act 1824 c 102
 Duchy of Cornwall Act 1824 c 78
 Duties in Docks, etc. (Ireland) Act 1824 c 92
 Duties on Coals Act 1824 c 46
 Duties on Colonial Rum Act 1824 c 34
 Duties on East India Goods, etc. Act 1824 c 76
 Duties on Foreign Vessels Act 1824 c 1
 Duties on Glass, etc. Act 1824 c 40
 Duties on Hides, etc. Act 1824 c 55
 Duties on Sugar, etc. Act 1824 c 15
 East India Company Act 1824 c 88
 Entail Provisions Act 1824 c 87
 Exchequer Bills Act 1824 c 2
 Excise and Customs Act 1824 c 75
 Exemption from House Tax Act 1824 c 44
 Fisheries Act 1824 c 64
 Gaols, etc. (England) Act 1824 c 85
 Gaol Sessions Act 1824 c 12
 Highland Roads (Scotland) Act 1824 c 38
 Horse Hides Act 1824 c 57
 Indemnity Act 1824 c 6
 Insolvent Debtors (England) Act 1824 c 61
 Insurrections, etc. (Ireland) Act 1824 c 105
 Law Proceedings (Ireland) Act 1824 c 4
 Licenses to Brew and Sell Beer, etc. Act 1824 c 54
 Maintenance of Lunatics Act 1824 c 71
 Male Convicts Act 1824 c 19
 Mar Peerage Restoration Act 1824 c 59
 Marine Assurance Act 1824 c 114
 Marine Mutiny Act 1824 c 14
 Marriage Act 1824 c 32
 Marriages Confirmation (Newfoundland) Act 1824 c 68
 Masters and Workmen Arbitration Act 1824 c 96
 Militia Pay Act 1824 c 33
 Mutiny Act 1824 c 13
 National Debt Act 1824 c 9
 National Debt Act 1824 c 11
 National Debt Act 1824 c 24
 National Debt Act 1824 c 45
 National Debt Act 1824 c 53
 Newfoundland Act 1824 c 67
 Newfoundland Fisheries Act 1824 c 51
 Oath, Revenue Officers Act 1824 c 79
 Oaths, Earl Marshal, etc. Act 1824 c 109
 Post Office Buildings Act 1824 c 5
 Postage Act 1824 c 10
 Price of Bread Act 1824 c 50
 Proctors (Ireland) Act 1824 c 27
 Prosecution by Customs or Excise Act 1824 c 94
 Public Works Loans Act 1824 c 36
 Public Works Loans Act 1824 c 77
 Quartering of Soldiers Act 1824 c 31
 Refined Sugar Bounties Act 1824 c 35
 Regent's Park, Regent Street, etc. Act 1824 c 100
 Relief of Bankers (Ireland) Act 1824 c 73
 Relief of Certain Incumbents Act 1824 c 89
 Repeal of Certain Duties Act 1824 c 22
 Repeal of Salt Duties Act 1824 c 65
 Revenue Inquiry Act 1824 c 7
 Salaries of County Officers (Ireland) Act 1824 c 93
 Savings Banks Act 1824 c 62
 Silk Manufacturers Act 1824 c 21
 Silk Manufactures Act 1824 c 66
 Slave Trade Act 1824 c 17
 Slave Trade Act 1824 c 113
 St. David's College Act 1824 c 101
 Stamps Act 1824 c 41
 Stealing of Records, etc. Act 1824 c 30
 Summary Convictions, etc. Act 1824 c 18
 Superannuation Allowances Act 1824 c 104
 Supply Act 1824 c 3
 Supply Act 1824 c 42
 Teinds Act 1824 c 72
 Transfer of Singapore to East India Company, etc. Act 1824 c 108
 Transportation Act 1824 c 84
 Turnpike Roads Act 1824 c 69
 Unlawful Weights (Ireland) Act 1824 c 110
 Vagrancy Act 1824 c 83
 Victualling Establishment, Plymouth Act 1824 c 49
 Weights and Measures Act 1824 c 74
 Whittlewood Forest Act 1824 c 99
 Wool Duties, etc. Act 1824 c 47

1825 (6 Geo. 4)

 American and West Indian Trade Act 1825 c 73
 Annuity for Prince George of Cumberland Act 1825 c 71
 Annuity for Princess Victoria Act 1825 c 72
 Apothecaries Amendment Act 1825 c 133
 Appropriation Act 1825 c 134
 Army Act 1825 c 61
 Articled Clerks Act 1825 c 46
 Articles of Clerkship Enrolment Act 1825 c 45
 Assizes (Ireland) Act 1825 c 51
 Bankers (Ireland) Act 1825 c 42
 Bankruptcy Act 1825 c 16
 British North America (Seigniorial Rights) Act 1825 c 59
 Bubble Companies, etc. Act 1825 c 91
 Buckingham Palace Act 1825 c 77
 Caledonian Canal Act 1825 c 15
 Canada Company Act 1825 c 75
 Chief Justice's Pension Act 1825 c 82
 Church Rates (Ireland) Act 1825 c 130
 Civil Service Pensions Act 1825 c 90
 Co-partnerships (Scotland) Act 1825 c 131
 Combinations of Workmen Act 1825 c 129
 Consular Advances Act 1825 c 87
 Costs on Private Bills, etc. Act 1825 c 123
 Cotton Mills, etc. Act 1825 c 63
 Court of Chancery (Ireland) Officers Act 1825 c 30
 Court of Common Pleas Act 1825 c 83
 Court of Exchequer (Ireland) Act 1825 c 55
 Courts of Justice Inquiry (Ireland) Act 1825 c 10
 Courts of Justice (Scotland) Act 1825 c 86
 Court of Session Act 1825 c 120
 Criminal Law Act 1825 c 25
 Crown Lands Act 1825 c 17
 Currency Act 1825 c 79
 Customs Act 1825 c 104
 Customs, etc. Act 1825 c 106
 Customs, etc. Act 1825 c 107
 Customs, etc. Act 1825 c 108
 Customs, etc. Act 1825 c 109
 Customs, etc. Act 1825 c 110
 Customs, etc. Act 1825 c 111
 Customs, etc. Act 1825 c 112
 Customs, etc. Act 1825 c 113
 Customs, etc. Act 1825 c 114
 Customs, etc. Act 1825 c 115
 Customs Law Repeal Act 1825 c. 105. Sometimes called the Customs' Laws' Repeal Act, the customs repeal Act, or the Customs Act 1825.
 Decrees, etc., Made at Rolls Court Act 1825 c 93
 Deserted Children (Ireland) Act 1825 c 102
 Dissolution of Levant Company Act 1825 c 33
 Dublin Streets Act 1825 c 128
 Duke of Atholl's Rights, Isle of Man Act 1825 c 34
 Duties on Beer, Malt, etc. Act 1825 c 58
 Duties on Glass, etc. Act 1825 c 117
 Duties on Mauritius Act 1825 c 76
 Duties on Offices Act 1825 c 9
 Duties on Plate, etc. Act 1825 c 118
 Duties on Spirits Act 1825 c 80
 Duty on Wheat Act 1825 c 64
 Entry of Warehoused Corn Act 1825 c 65
 Exchequer Bills Act 1825 c 2
 Exchequer Bills Act 1825 c 70
 Exchequer, Equity Side (Ireland) Act 1825 c 60
 Exciseable Liquors Act 1825 c 37
 Excise Licences Act 1825 c 81
 Factor Act 1825 c 94
 Forgery Act 1825 c 56
 Glebe Exchange Act 1825 c 8
 Holyhead Road Act 1825 c 100
 House Tax Act 1825 c 7
 Importation Act 1825 c 29
 Impounding of Distresses (Ireland) Act 1825 c 43
 Indemnity Act 1825 c 3
 Indian Salaries and Pensions Act 1825 c 85
 Infants, Lunatics, etc. Act 1825 c 74
 Insolvent Debtors Act 1825 c 121
 Judges' Pensions Act 1825 c 84
 Juries Act 1825 c 50
 Jurors (Scotland) Act 1825 c 22
 Justice of the Peace, Metropolis Act 1825 c 21
 Justices of the Peace Small Debt (Scotland) Act 1825 c 48
 Land Tax Act 1825 c 32
 Leasing-making (Scotland) Act 1825 c 47
 Linen Manufacturers (Ireland) Act 1825 c 122
 Lunatic Asylums (L.) Act 1825 c 54
 Lunatics Act 1825 c 53
 Malicious Wounding, etc. (Scotland) Act 1825 c 126
 Manors, etc. (Ireland) Act 1825 c 99
 Marine Mutiny Act 1825 c 6
 Marriages Confirmation Act 1825 c 92
 Marylebone District Rectories Act 1825 c 124
 Militia Pay Act 1825 c 31
 Mortgages of County Rates Act 1825 c 40
 Mutiny Act 1825 c 5
 Naturalization and Restoration of Blood Act 1825 c 67
 Navy Pay Act 1825 c 18
 Newspaper Stamps Act 1825 c 119
 Passenger Vessels Act 1825 c 116
 Payment of Creditors (Scotland) Act 1825 c 11
 Pembroke Dock Act 1825 c 36
 Pilotage Act 1825 c 125
 Piratical Ships Act 1825 c 49
 Poor Prisoners (Scotland) Act 1825 c 62
 Poor Relief (Settlement) Act 1825 c 57
 Postage Act 1825 c 28
 Postage Act 1825 c 44
 Postage Act 1825 c 68
 Presentments for Salaries (Ireland) Act 1825 c 52
 Protection of Property in Orchards, etc. Act 1825 c 127
 Public Works Loans Act 1825 c 35
 Purchase for Naval Yard at Leith, etc. Act 1825 c 103
 Purchase of Common Law Offices Act 1825 c 89
 Quarantine Act 1825 c 78
 Quartering of Soldiers Act 1825 c 20
 Regent Street, etc. Act 1825 c 38
 Relief to Chelsea, etc., Pensioners Act 1825 c 27
 Repair of Roads and Bridges (Ireland) Act 1825 c 101
 Royal Naval Asylum, etc. Act 1825 c 26
 Salcey Forest Act 1825 c 132
 Sergeants at Law Act 1825 c 95
 Sheriff Courts (Scotland) Act 1825 c 23
 Small Debts (Scotland) Act 1825 c 24
 Stamps Act 1825 c 41
 Supply Act 1825 c 1
 Supply Act 1825 c 14
 Threatening Letters Act 1825 c 19
 Tokens Act 1825 c 98
 Transportation Act 1825 c 69
 Trial of Peers (Scotland) Act 1825 c 66
 Universities Act 1825 c 97
 Unlawful Societies (Ireland) Act 1825 c 4
 Van Diemen's Land Company Act 1825 c 39
 Weights and Measures Act 1825 c 12
 West Indian Bishops, etc. Act 1825 c 88
 Wine, etc., Duties Act 1825 c 13
 Writs of Error Act 1825 c 96

1826

7 Geo. 4
 Administration of Justice, Durham Act 1826 c 17
 Admiralty Offences Act 1826 c 38
 Advances by Bank of England Act 1826 c 7
 Advances for Rebuilding London Bridge Act 1826 c 40
 Alehouses (England) Act 1826 c 65
 Aliens Act 1826 c 54
 Appropriation Act 1826 c 79
 Army Act 1826 c 31
 Assault and Battery (Scotland) Act 1826 c 19
 Assessed Taxes Act 1826 c 22
 Assignment and Sub-letting of Land (Ireland) Act 1826 c 29
 Bank Notes Act 1826 c 6
 Bankers (Scotland) Act 1826 c 67
 Benefices (Ireland) Act 1826 c 73
 Board of Trade (President) Act 1826 c 32
 British and Irish Fisheries Act 1826 c 34
 Chelsea and Kilmainham Hospitals Act 1826 c 16
 Church Rates (Ireland) Act 1826 c 72
 Civil Bill Courts (Ireland) Act 1826 c 36
 Clergy Residence Act 1826 c 66
 Corn Act 1826 c 70
 Corn Act 1826 c 71
 Country Bankers Act 1826 c 46
 County Buildings Act 1826 c 63
 Criminal Law Act 1826 c 64
 Customs Act 1826 c 48
 Destruction of Dwelling Houses (Ireland) Act 1826 c 60
 Distillation (Scotland) Act 1826 c 25
 Duties on Personal Estates Act 1826 c 26
 East India Officers' Act 1826 c 56. Sometimes called the East Indian Officers Act.
 Entailed Estates Act 1826 c 45
 Exchequer Bills Act 1826 c 2
 Exchequer Bills Act 1826 c 50
 Excise Act 1826 c 23
 Excise (Ireland) Act 1826 c 49
 Exportation of Salmon, etc., from Ireland Act 1826 c 47
 Greenwich Hospital Act 1826 c 35
 Hard Labour (Ireland) Act 1826 c 9
 Holyhead Road Act 1826 or the Holyhead Bridges and Roads Act c 76
 Houses of Parliament Act 1826 c 78
 Importation of Silk Act 1826 c 53
 Impounding of Cattle (Ireland) Act 1826 c 42
 Indemnity Act 1826 c 3
 Insolvent Debtors (England) Act 1826 c 57
 Juries, East Indies Act 1826 c 37
 Juries (Scotland) Act 1826 c 8
 Justices (Ireland) Act 1826 c 61
 Lands of Dallas, Receiver-General Act 1826 c 12
 Lands of Tilson, Receiver-General Act 1826 c 28
 Legislative Assembly, Upper Canada Act 1826 c 68
 Licensing of Stage Coaches Act 1826 c 33
 Lunacy (Ireland) Act 1826 c 14
 Mandamus (Ireland) Act 1826 c 21
 Manor Courts (Ireland) Act 1826 c 41
 Marine Mutiny Act 1826 c 11
 Memorials of Grants of Annuities Act 1826 c 75
 Merchant Seamen Act 1826 c 59
 Militia Pay Act 1826 c 27
 Mutiny Act 1826 c 10
 National Debt Act 1826 c 39
 Naval Forces in India Act 1826 c 52
 Poll at Elections, Yorkshire Act 1826 c 55
 Prisons (England) Act 1826 c 18
 Prisons (Ireland) Act 1826 c 74
 Public Works Loans Act 1826 c 30
 Quartering of Soldiers Act 1826 c 24
 Recovery of Small Tithes Act 1826 c 15
 Regent Street, Carlton Place Act 1826 c 77
 Salaries of Bishops, etc., in West Indies Act 1826 c 4
 Sale of Crown Lands Act 1826 c 51
 Shipping Under Treaties of Commerce Act 1826 c 5
 Site for Record Office (Ireland) Act 1826 c 13
 Stamp Duties (Ireland) Act 1826 c 20
 Stamps Act 1826 c 44
 Stealing from Gardens Act 1826 c 69
 Supply Act 1826 c 1
 Transfer of Trust Estates, etc. (Ireland) Act 1826 c 43
 Valuation of Lands (Ireland) Act 1826 c 62
 Yeomanry Act 1826 c 58

Local and personal Acts
 Metropolis Roads Act 1826 c. cxlii

7 & 8 Geo. 4
 Exchequer Bills Act 1826 c 2
 Importation Act 1826 c 3
 Supply Act 1826 c 1

1827 (7 & 8 Geo. 4)

 Administration of Justice, New South, Wales, etc. Act 1827 c 73
 Admiralty Act 1827 c 65
 Advances for Public Works Act 1827 c 47
 Alehouses (England) Act 1827 c 48
 Arts. of Clerkship, etc., Inrolment Act 1827 c 45
 Average Price of Corn Act 1827 c 58
 Bills of Exchange, etc. Act 1827 c 15
 Board of Stamps in Great Britain and Ireland Act 1827 c 55
 Butter Trade (Ireland) Act 1827 c 61
 Church Building Act 1827 c 72
 Clergy Reserves, Canada Act 1827 c 62
 Compositions for Tithes (Ireland) Act 1827 c 60
 Corrupt Practices at Elections Act 1827 c 37
 Costs on Private Bills Act 1827 c 64
 Criminal Law Act 1827 c 28
 Criminal Statutes (England), Repeal Act 1827 c 27
 Crown Lands Act 1827 c 66
 Crown Lands (Ireland) Act 1827 c 68
 Customs Act 1827 c 56
 Deserted Children (Ireland) Act 1827 c 36
 Destruction of Dwelling Houses (Ireland) Act 1827 c 32
 Distress (Costs) Act 1827 c 17
 Distresses (Ireland) Act 1827 c 69
 Duke and Duchess of Clarence's Annuity Act 1827 c 10
 Duties on Personal Estates Act 1827 c 7
 Exchequer Bills Act 1827 c 41
 Exchequer Bills and Appropriation Act 1827 c 70
 Exchequer, Equity Side (Ireland), etc. Act 1827 c 51
 Excise Management Act 1827 c 53
 Excise on Malt Act 1827 c 52
 Fraudulent Bankrupts (Scotland) Act 1827 c 20
 Game Certificates (United Kingdom) Act 1827 c 49
 General Register House, Edinburgh Act 1827 c 46
 Glass Duties Act 1827 c 40
 Importation of Corn Act 1827 c 57
 Imprisonment for Debt Act 1827 c 71
 Indemnity Act 1827 c 13
 Insolvent Debtors (Ireland) Act 1827 c 22
 Land Tax Commissioners Act 1827 c 75
 Larceny Act 1827 c 29
 London and Holyhead and Liverpool Roads Act 1827 c 35
 Malicious Injuries to Property (England) Act 1827 c 30
 Manor Courts (Ireland) Act 1827 c 59
 Marine Mutiny Act 1827 c 5
 Militia Pay Act 1827 c 50
 Millbank Penitentiary Act 1827 c 33
 Minister's Money (Ireland) Act 1827 c 34
 Mutiny Act 1827 c 4
 Mutiny Act 1827 c 63
 Ounce Thread Manufacture Act 1827 c 9
 Passenger Vessels Act 1827 c 19
 Payment of Creditors (Scotland) Act 1827 c 11
 Pensions Act 1827 c 8
 Petty Sessions (Ireland) Act 1827 c 67
 Postage Act 1827 c 6
 Postage Act 1827 c 21
 Prerogative Court, etc. (Ireland) Act 1827 c 44
 Presentments by Constables Act 1827 c 38
 Public Works Loans (Ireland) Act 1827 c 12
 Quartering of Soldiers Act 1827 c 14
 Rates of Carriage of Goods Act 1827 c 39
 Remedies Against the Hundred (England) Act 1827 c 31
 Resignation Bonds Act 1827 c 25
 Roads, etc. (Ireland) Act 1827 c 23
 Slave Trade, Convention with Brazil Act 1827 c 74
 Slave Trade, Treaty with Sweden Act 1827 c 54
 Spring Guns Act 1827 c 18
 Supply Act 1827 c 16
 Supply Act 1827 c 42
 Turnpike Roads (England) Act 1827 c 24
 Union of Parishes (Ireland) Act 1827 c 43
 Youghal Rectory Act 1827 c 26

1828 (9 Geo. 4)

 Administration of Estates in India Act 1828 c 33
 Advance for Welland Canal, Canada Act 1828 c 91
 Alehouse Act 1828 c 61
 Amendment of Record in Civil Actions Act 1828 c 15
 (An Act to enlarge the Powers granted to His Majesty under an Act passed in the Fifty-seventh Year of His late Majesty, to enable His Majesty to recompense the Service of Persons holding, or who have held, certain high and efficient Civil Offices) c 28. Sometimes called the Supply Act 1828. The Bill for this Act was the Pensions Act Amendment Bill, previously called the Offices Pensions Bill.
 Appropriation Act 1828 c 95
 Australian Courts Act 1828 c 83
 Bank Notes Act 1828 c 23
 Bank Notes (No. 2) Act 1828 c 65
 Bank Notes (Ireland) Act 1828 c 81
 Bankers' Composition (Ireland) Act 1828 c 80
 Bills of Exchange (Ireland) Act 1828 c 24
 Bombay Marine Act 1828 c 72
 Butter Trade (Ireland) Act 1828 c 88
 Canada Company Amendment Act 1828 c 51
 Church Building Society Act 1828 c 42
 Cinque Ports Act 1828 c 37
 Cinque Ports Pilots Act 1828 c 86
 Circuit Courts (Scotland) Act 1828 c 29
 Civil Rights of Convicts Act 1828 c 32
 Clergy Resignation Bonds Act 1828 c 94
 Constables (Ireland) Act 1828 c 63
 Controverted Elections Act 1828 c 22
 County Lunatic Asylums (England) Act 1828 c 40
 Criminal Law (India) Act 1828 c 74
 Criminal Law (Ireland) Act 1828 c 54 (Repealed on 31 July 1964 (date of royal assent) by the Statute Law Revision Act 1964 (c.79), s.1 & Sch.)
 Criminal Statutes (Ireland) Repeal Act 1828 c 53
 Customs Act 1828 c 76
 Delivery of Sugar Out of Bond Act 1828 c 93
 Deputy Warden of the Cinque Ports Act 1828 c 71
 Deserted Children (Ireland) Act 1828 c 87
 Distillation of Spirits Act 1828 c 45
 Division of Counties Act 1828 c 43
 Duties on Glass Act 1828 c 48
 Duties on Personal Estates, etc. Act 1828 c 5
 East India Company, Prize Money Act 1828 c 50
 Exchequer Bills Act 1828 c 2
 Exchequer Bills Act 1828 c 89
 Excise Act 1828 c 44
 Holyhead Road Act 1828 or the Holyhead Roads Act c 75
 Hotel Keepers Act 1828 c 46
 Importation of Corn Act 1828 c 60
 Importation of Foreign Wheat Act 1828 c 20
 Indemnity Act 1828 c 6
 Insolvent Debtors, East Indies Act 1828 c 73
 Keeper of Register of Hornings, etc. (Scotland) Act 1828 c 26
 Killiney Chapel Act 1828 c 52
 Land Tax Commissioners' Act 1828 c 38
 Lands Purchased for Charitable Purposes Act 1828 c 85
 Larceny (Ireland) Act 1828 c 55
 Licensing (Scotland) Act 1828 c 58
 Life Annuities Act 1828 c 16
 Lighting, etc., of Cities, etc. (Ireland) Act 1828 c 7
 Lighting of Towns (Ireland) Act 1828 c 82
 Linen and Hempen Manufacturers Act 1828 c 62
 Lunatics' Estates Act 1828 c 78
 Malicious Injuries to Property (Ireland) Act 1828 c 56
 Marine Mutiny Act 1828 c 3
 Madhouse Act 1828 c 41. Also called the Madhouses Act 1828 or the Lunatics (England) Act 1828.
 Madhouses (Scotland) Act 1828 c 34
 Militia Pay Act 1828 c 67
 Mutiny Act 1828 c 4
 National Debt Reduction Act 1828 c 90
 Nautical Almanack Act 1828 c 66
 Night Poaching Act 1828 c 69
 Offences against the Person Act 1828 c 31
 Parliamentary Elections (England) Act 1828 c 59
 Passage Vessel Licences Act 1828 c 47
 Passengers in Merchant Vessels Act 1828 c 21
 Protection of Purchasers Against Judgements (Ireland) Act 1828 c 35
 Quartering of Soldiers Act 1828 c 8
 Receipt Stamps Act 1828 c 27
 Regent Street Act 1828 c 64
 Regent Street, etc. Act 1828 c 70
 Registry of Deeds, etc. (Ireland) Act 1828 c 57
 Retail Brewers Act 1828 c 68
 Revenue Solicitors' Act 1828 c 25 
 Sacramental Test Act 1828 c 17
 Salmon Fisheries (Scotland) Act 1828 c 39
 Savings Bank Act 1828 c 92
 Sessions of the Peace, Westminster Act 1828 c 9
 Slave Trade Act 1828 c 84
 Stamp Duties Act 1828 c 49
 Stamp Duties on Cards and Dice Act 1828 c 18
 Stamps on Fire Insurances Act 1828 c 13
 Statute of Frauds Amendment Act 1828 c 14
 Sugar Duties Act 1828 c 36
 Superannuation, etc. Act 1828 c 79
 Supply Act 1828 c 1
 Supply Act 1828 c 10
 Supply Act 1828 c 19
 Supply Act 1828 c 30
 Turnpike Roads (England) Act 1828 c 77
 Use of Fire on Steamboats Act 1828 c 11
 Witnesses' Indemnity, Penryn Act, 1828 c 12

1829 (10 Geo. 4)

 Appropriation Act 1829 c 60
 Arms (Ireland) Act 1829 c 47
 Arrest on Mesne Process (Ireland) Act 1829 c 35
 Assessed Taxes Act 1829 c 21
 British and Spanish Claims Convention Act 1829 c 20
 Butter Trade (Ireland) Act 1829 c 41
 Care, etc., of Lunatics Act 1829 c 18
 Charitable Loan Societies (Ireland) Act 1829 c 42
 Charity Commission Act 1829 c 57
 Coroners (Ireland) Act 1829 c 37
 Court Funds Act 1829 c 13
 Criminal Law (Scotland) Act 1829 c 38
 Crown Lands Act 1829 c 50
 Customs Act 1829 c 43
 Dangerous Assemblies (Ireland) Act 1829 c 1
 Delivery of Sugar out of Bond Act 1829 c 49
 Duties on Personal Estates, etc. Act 1829 c 2
 East India Company Act 1829 c 16
 Ecclesiastical Courts Act 1829 c 53
 Exchequer Bills Act 1829 c 4
 Excise Act 1829 c 32
 Friendly Societies Act 1829 c 56
 Gaol Reports (Scotland) Act 1829 c 54
 Government Annuities Act 1829 c 24
 Government of Western Australia Act 1829 c 22
 Greenwich Hospital Act 1829 c 25
 Greenwich Hospital Outpensions, etc. Act 1829 c 26
 Indemnity Act 1829 c 12
 India: Disqualification for House of Commons Act 1829 c 62
 Insolvent Debtors Relief (Ireland) Act 1829 c 36
 Irish Fisheries Act 1829 c 33
 Justices of the Peace, Metropolis Act 1829 c 45
 Labour in Cotton Mills, etc. Act 1829 c 51
 Labour in Cotton Mills, etc. Act 1829 c 63
 Marine Mutiny Act 1829 c 5
 Masters and Apprentices Act 1829 c 52
 Metropolitan Police Act 1829 c 44
 Metropolis Roads Act 1829 c 59. Also called the Metropolitan Turnpikes Act 1829.
 Militia Act 1829 c 10
 Militia Pay Act 1829 c 29
 Mutiny Act 1829 c 6
 National Debt Act 1829 c 27
 National Debt Act 1829 c 31
 Naval Officers' Widows' Charity Act 1829 c 14
 Navy and Victualling Departments Act 1829 c 15
 Newfoundland Fisheries, etc. Act 1829 c 17
 Offences against the Person (Ireland) Act 1829 c 34
 Oran and Drumtemple Act 1829 c 58
 Parliamentary Elections (Ireland) Act 1829 c 8
 Payment of Creditors (Scotland) Act 1829 c 11
 Petty Sessional Divisions, High Constables Act 1829 c 46
 Quartering of Soldiers Act 1829 c 9
 Regent Street Act 1829 c 61
 Register of Sasines Act 1829 c 19
 Roads, etc. (Ireland) Act 1829 c 40
 Roman Catholic Relief Act 1829 c 7
 Sale, etc., of Certain Stocks Act 1829 c 48
 Silk Duties Act 1829 c 23
 Small Debts (Scotland) Act 1829 c 55
 Sugar Duties Act 1829 c 39
 Supply Act 1829 c 3
 Supply Act 1829 c 28
 Yeomanry Corps (Ireland) Act, 1829 c 30

1830 – 1839

1830

11 Geo. 4 & 1 Will. 4

1 Will. 4
 Appropriation Act 1830 c 5
 Colonial Offices Act 1830 c 4
 Commissions, etc., Continuance Act 1830 c 6
 Law Terms (Explanation) Act 1830 c 3
 Regency Act 1830 c 2
 Supply Act 1830 c 1

1831

1 Will. 4
 Census (Ireland) Act 1831 c 19
 Civil List Act 1831 c 25
 Duties on Calicoes, etc., Repeal Act 1831 c 17
 Duties on Personal Estates, etc. Act 1831 c 12
 Evidence on Commission Act 1831 c 22
 Exchequer Bills Act 1831 c 11
 Execution of Judgments Act 1831 c 7
 Indemnity Act 1831 c 26
 Land Tenure, Lower Canada Act 1831 c 20
 Marine Mutiny Act 1831 c 14
 Mutiny Act 1831 c 15
 Payment of Creditors (Scotland) Act 1831 c 16
 Poor Relief (Settlement) Act 1831 c 18
 Postmaster-General Act 1831 c 8
 Prohibition and Mandamus Act 1831 c 21
 Richmond Lunatic Asylum Act 1831 c 13
 Sale of Post Office Buildings Act 1831 c 27
 Sugar Duties Act 1831 c 23
 Supply Act 1831 c 9
 Supply Act 1831 c 10
 Trade with British Possession Act 1831 c 24

1 & 2 Will. 4

1832 (2 & 3 Will. 4)

1833 (3 & 4 Will. 4)

 Administration of Estates Act 1833 c 104
 Apprentices Act 1833 c 63
 Appropriation Act 1833 c 96
 Army (Artillery, &c.,) Pensions Act 1833 c 29
 Assessed Taxes Act 1833 c 34
 Assessed Taxes Act 1833 c 39
 Assizes Act 1833 c 71
 Bank Notes Act 1833 c 83
 Bank of England Act 1833 c 98
 Buckingham Palace Act 1833 c 81
 Burgh Police (Scotland) Act 1833 c 46
 Chancery Regulation Act 1833 c. 94. Also called the Court of Chancery (England) Act 1833.
 China Trade Act 1833 c 93
 Cholera Prevention Act 1833 c 75
 Church Temporalities (Ireland) Act 1833 c 37
 Civil Procedure Act 1833 c 42
 Commissioners of Lunacy Act 1833 c 36
 Composition for Tithes (Ireland) Act 1833 c 100
 County Infirmaries (Ireland) Act 1833 c 92
 Court of Bankruptcy (England) Act 1833 c 47
 Criminal Law Act 1833 c 44
 Crown Lands Act 1833 c 86
 Crown Lands (Scotland) Act 1833 c 69
 Customs Act 1833 c 10
 Customs, etc. Act 1833 c 51
 Customs, etc. Act 1833 c 52
 Customs, etc. Act 1833 c 53
 Customs, etc. Act 1833 c 54
 Customs, etc. Act 1833 c 55
 Customs, etc. Act 1833 c 56
 Customs, etc. Act 1833 c 57
 Customs, etc. Act 1833 c 58
 Customs, etc. Act 1833 c 59
 Customs, etc. Act 1833 c 60
 Customs, etc. Act 1833 c 61
 Customs (Repeal) Act 1833 c 50
 Dower Act 1833 c 105
 Dramatic Copyright Act 1833 c 15
 Duties of Package, etc., London Act 1833 c 66
 Duties on Personal Estates Repeal Act 1833 c 12
 Duties on Soap Act 1833 c 16
 Duties on Sugar, etc. Act 1833 c 3
 Exchequer Bills Act 1833 c 2
 Exchequer Bills Act 1833 c 25
 Excise Duties, etc., on Tiles Repeal Act 1833 c 11
 Fines Act 1833 c 99
 Fines and Recoveries Act 1833 c 74
 Forest of Dean Act 1833 c 38
 Government Annuities Act 1833 c 24
 Grand Jury (Ireland) Act 1833 c 78
 Holyhead Road Act 1833 c 43
 Inclosure Act 1833 c 87
 Inclosure and Drainage (Rates) Act 1833 c 35
 Indemnity Act 1833 c 7
 Inheritance Act 1833 c 106
 Judicial Committee Act 1833 c 41
 Juries (Ireland) Act 1833 c 91
 Labour of Children, etc., in Factories Act 1833 c 103
 Land Tax Commissioners (Appointment) Act 1833 c 95
 Licensing (Ireland) Act 1833 c 68
 Lighting and Watching Act 1833 c 90
 Loans for Public Works Act 1833 c 32
 Local Disturbances, etc. (Ireland) Act 1833 c 4
 London Hackney Carriages Act 1833 c 48
 Lord Chancellor's Offices Act 1833 c 84
 Lunatics (England) Act 1833 c 64
 Manufacturers of Stone Blue Act 1833 c 17
 Marine Mutiny Act 1833 c 6
 Marriages at Hamburg Act 1833 c 45
 Marriages by Roman Catholics (Ireland) Act 1833 c 102
 Merchant Seamen Act 1833 c 88
 Metropolitan Police Act 1833 c 89
 Militia Ballots Suspension Act 1833 c 21
 Militia Pay Act 1833 c 62
 Mutiny Act 1833 c 5
 Parliamentary Burghs (Scotland) Act 1833 c 77
 Police Magistrates, Metropolis Act 1833 c 19
 Poor Rate Exemption Act 1833 c 30
 Poor Removal Act 1833 c 40
 Public Notaries Act 1833 c 70
 Public Revenue (Scotland) Act 1833 c 13
 Quakers and Moravians Act 1833 c 49
 Quays, etc., Between the Tower and London Bridge Act 1833 c 8
 Real Property Limitation Act 1833 c 27
 River Liffey, Dublin Act 1833 c 26
 Roads, etc. (Scotland) Act 1833 c 33
 Royal Burghs (Scotland) Act 1833 c 76
 The Saint Helena Act 1833 or the Government of India Act 1833 c 85
 Savings Bank Act 1833 c 14
 Seamen's Hospital Society Act 1833 c 9
 Separatists' Affirmations Act 1833 c 82
 Sewers Act 1833 c 22
 Slave Trade Act 1833 c 72
 Slavery Abolition Act 1833 c 73
 Stafford Election Act 1833 c 20
 Stamps Act 1833 c 23
 Stamps, etc. Act 1833 c 97
 Sunday Observance Act 1833 c 31
 Supply Act 1833 c 1
 Supply Act 1833 c 18
 Tea Duties Act 1833 c 101
 Trial of Offences (Ireland) Act 1833 c 79
 Turnpike Trusts Returns Act 1833 c 80
 Woollen Trade Act 1833 c 28
 Woolwich Dockyard Act 1833 c 65
 Writs of Execution Act 1833 c 67

1834 (4 & 5 Will. 4)

Public General Acts
 Advances for Public Works Act 1834 c 72
 Application of Interest on Contracts for Redemption of Land Tax Act 1834 c 11
 Apportionment Act 1834 c 22
 Appropriation Act 1834 c 84
 April Quarter Sessions Act 1834 c 47
 Arms and Gunpowder (Ireland) Act 1834 c 53
 Assessed Taxes Act 1834 c 54
 Assessed Taxes Act 1834 c 73
 Bayswater Sewer Act 1834 c 96
 Beerhouse Act 1834 c 85
 Bounty on Hemp, etc., Repeal Act 1834 c 14
 Bridges (Ireland) Act 1834 c 61
 Burghs, etc. (Scotland) Act 1834 c 86
 Central Criminal Court Act 1834 c 36
 Chancery (Ireland) Act 1834 c 78
 Chimney Sweepers Act 1834 c 35
 Church Temporalities Act 1834 c 90
 Common Fields Exchange Act 1834 c 30
 Costs in Actions of Quare Impedit. Act 1834 c 39
 County Rates Act 1834 c 48
 Court of Common Pleas of Lancaster Act 1834 c 62
 Court of Justice (Ireland) Act 1834 c 68
 Customs Act 1834 c 89
 East India Company Act 1834 c 33
 Exchequer Bills Act 1834 c 3
 Exchequer Bills Act 1834 c 58
 Exchequer (Scotland) Act 1834 c 16
 Excise Act 1834 c 75
 Excise Management Act 1834 c 51
 Fever Hospitals (Ireland) Act 1834 c 46
 Fines and Recoveries (Ireland) Act 1834 c 92
 Forest of Dean Boundary Commission, etc. Act 1834 c 59
 Friendly Societies Act 1834 c 40
 Grants of Privileges to Companies Act 1834 c 94
 Greenwich Hospital Act 1834 c 34
 Hanging in Chains Act 1834 c 26
 Hay and Straw Act 1834 c 21
 House of Commons Officers Act 1834 c 70
 House Tax Act 1834 c 19
 Indemnity Act 1834 c 9
 Insolvent Debtors, India Act 1834 c 79
 Insolvent Debtors (Ireland) Act 1834 c 56
 Irish Roads Act 1834 c 50
 Juries (Ireland) Act 1834 c 8
 Justices' Qualification (Scilly Islands) Act 1834 c 43
 Land Tax Act 1834 c 60
 Liverpool Election Act 1834 c 18
 Loan: by Trustees on Landed Securities (Ireland) Act 1834 c 29
 Local Disturbances, etc. (Ireland) Act 1834 c 38
 Lotteries for Improvement of Glasgow Act 1834 c 37
 Marine Mutiny Act 1834 c 4
 Marriage (Scotland) Act 1834 c 28
 Menai and Conway Bridges Act 1834 c 66
 Merchant Seaman's Widows, etc. Act 1834 c 52
 Militia Ballots Suspension Act 1834 c 64
 Militia Pay Act 1834 c 63
 Mumbles Head Lighthouse Act 1834 c 69
 Mutiny Act 1834 c 6
 National Debt Act 1834 c 31
 National Debt Act 1834 c 80
 Navy Pay Act 1834 c 25
 New Churches (Scotland) Act 1834 c 41
 Norfolk Island Act 1834 c 65
 Office of Receipt of Exchequer Act 1834 c 15
 Parliamentary Elections (Scotland) Act 1834 c 88
 Payment of Creditors (Scotland) Act 1834 c 74
 Poor Law Amendment Act 1834 c 76
 Postage Act 1834 c 44
 Postage in North American Colonies Act 1834 c 7
 Printers, etc., of Newspapers (Ireland) Act 1834 c 71
 Regulation of Factories Act 1834 c 1
 Retail of Sweets, etc. Act 1834 c 77
 Royal Burghs, etc. (Scotland) Act 1834 c 87
 Sale of Fish Act 1834 c 20
 Service of Process out of the Jurisdiction England and Ireland Act 1834 c 82
 Smuggling Act 1834 c 13
 South Australia Act 1834 c 95
 Stamps Act 1834 c 57
 Stannaries Court of Cornwall Act 1834 c 42
 Sugar Duties Act 1834 c 5
 Summary Convictions (Ireland) Act 1834 c 93
 Superannuation Act 1834 c 24
 Superannuation Act Amendment Act 1834 c 45
 Supply Act 1834 c 2
 Supply Act 1834 c 12
 Tithes Prescription Act 1834 c 83
 Tonnage Rates (Port of London) Act 1834 c 32
 Transportation Act 1834 c 67
 Trial of Felonies in Certain Boroughs Act 1834 c 27
 Trust Property, Escheat Act 1834 c 23
 Turnpike Acts Continuance Act 1834 c 10
 Turnpike Roads (Ireland) Act 1834 c 91
 Turnpike Tolls (Allowance of Wagon Weights) Act 1834 c 81
 Valuation (Ireland) Act 1834 c 55
 Warwick Election Act 1834 c 17
 Weights and Measures Act 1834 c 49

Local Acts
 City of London Constables Act 1834 c. lxxvii

1835 (5 & 6 Will. 4)

 Abolition of Slavery Act 1835 c 45
 Appropriation Act 1835 c 80
 Assizes (Ireland) Act 1835 c 26
 Bail in Cases of Forgery, etc. (Scotland) Act 1835 c 73
 Bankruptcy Act 1835 c 29
 Capital Punishment Abolition Act 1835 c 81
 Chancery (Ireland) Act 1835 c 16
 Charities Inquiries (England) Act 1835 c 71
 Clerk of Crown in Chancery Act 1835 c 47
 Crown Lands (Scotland) Act 1835 c 58
 Cruelty to Animals Act 1835 c 59
 Customs Act 1835 c 66
 Declarations Act 1835 c 8
 Declarations, etc., to be Taken by Sheriffs Act 1835 c 28
 Dominica, etc., Relief Act 1835 c 51
 Dominica Importation Act 1835 c 10
 Duty on Wood Act 1835 c 40
 Exchequer Bills Act 1835 c 4
 Exchequer Bills Act 1835 c 44
 Exchequer Court (Scotland) Act 1835 c 46
 Excise Act 1835 c 39
 Excise Incorporation (Scotland) Act 1835 c 72
 Execution of Criminals, Chester Act 1835 c 1
 Gaming Act 1835 c 41
 Glass Duties Act 1835 c 77
 Governor-General, etc., Indemnity, etc., India Act 1835 c 6
 Highway Act 1835 c 50
 Imprisonment for Debt (Scotland) Act 1835 c 70
 Indemnity Act 1835 c 11
 India (North-West Provinces) Act 1835 c 52
 Infants' Property (Ireland) Act 1835 c 17
 Insolvency Courts Act 1835 c 42
 Isle of Man Importation Act 1835 c 13
 Larceny (Ireland) Act 1835 c 34
 Lectures Copyright Act 1835 c 65
 Letters Patent for Inventions Act 1835 c 83
 Linen Manufactures (Ireland) Act 1835 c 27. Sometimes called the Linen Manufacturers (Ireland) Act 1835.
 Loan Societies and Friendly Societies Act 1835 c 23
 Lunatics Act 1835 c 22
 Marine Mutiny Act 1835 c 7
 Marriage Act 1835 c 54
 Merchant Seamen Act 1835 c 19
 Merchant Vessels, etc. Act 1835 c 53
 Militia Act 1835 c 37
 Militia Pay Act 1835 c 68
 Municipal Corporations (England) Act 1835 c 76
 Mutiny Act 1835 c 5
 Naval Enlistment Act 1835 c 24
 Newspapers Printers Relief Act 1835 c 2
 Offices in Court of Chancery, etc. Act 1835 c 82
 Parliamentary Elections Act 1835 c 36
 Paymaster General Act 1835 c 35
 Peace Preservation (Ireland) Act 1835 c 48
 Piers and Quays (Ireland) Act 1835 c 84
 Post Office Act 1835 c 25
 Prisons Act 1835 c 38
 Removal of Indictments into King's Bench Act 1835 c 33
 Representation of the People (Scotland) Act 1835 c 78
 Roads (Ireland) Act 1835 c 31
 Savings Bank Act 1835 c 57
 Shannon Navigation Improvement Act 1835 c 67
 Sheriffs (Ireland) Act 1835 c 55
 Shrewsbury-Bangor Road Act 1835 c 21
 Slave Trade Act 1835 c 60
 Slave Trade Act 1835 c 61
 Soap Duty Allowances Act 1835 c 15
 Special Constables Act 1835 c 43
 Stamps and Taxes Act 1835 c 20
 Stamp Duties Act 1835 c 64
 Statutory Declarations Act 1835 c 62
 Sugar Duties and Exchequer Bills Act 1835 c 12
 Supply Act 1835 c 3
 Supply Act 1835 c 9
 Tea Duties Act 1835 c 32
 Tithes Act 1835 c 74
 Tithe Instalments Recover (Ireland) Act 1835 c 79
 Tithing of Turnips Severed from the Ground Act 1835 c 75
 Tonnage, etc., of Ships Act 1835 c 56
 Turnpike Acts Continuance Act 1835 c 49
 Turnpike Tolls Act 1835 c 18
 Union and Parish Property Act 1835 c 69
 Vacant Ecclesiastical Dignities, etc. Act 1835 c 30
 Weights and Measures Act 1835 c 63
 Western Australia Government Act 1835 c 14

1836 (6 & 7 Will. 4)

 Abolition of Slavery Act 1836 c 5
 Abolition of Slavery Act 1836 c 16
 Abolition of Slavery Act 1836 c 82
 Administration of Justice in Certain Boroughs Act 1836 c 105
 Administration of Justice, West Indies Act 1836 c 17
 Appropriation Act 1836 c 98
 Arms and Gunpowder (Ireland) Act 1836 c 39
 Bankruptcy Act 1836 c 27
 Bankruptcy (Ireland) Act 1836 c 14
 Bastards (Scotland) Act 1836 c 22
 Benefit Building Societies Act 1836 c 32
 Berwick-on-Tweed Act 1836 c 103
 Bills of Exchange Act 1836 c 58
 Births and Deaths Registration Act 1836 c 86
 Borough Fund in Certain Boroughs Act 1836 c 104
 Bread Act 1836 c 37
 Capital Punishment Abolition Act 1836 c 4
 Cessio (Scotland) Act 1836 c 56
 Chapels of Ease (Ireland) Act 1836 c 31
 Church Temporalities (Ireland) Act 1836 c 99
 Civil Bill Courts (Ireland) Act 1836 c 75
 Coal Trade Act 1836 c 109
 Commissary Court of Edinburgh, etc. Act 1836 c 41
 Constabulary (Ireland) Act 1836 c 13
 Constabulary (Ireland) Act 1836 (No. 2) c 36. Sometimes called the Constabulary (Ireland) (No. 2) Act 1836.
 Consuls in Ottoman Dominions Act 1836 c 78
 Copyright Act 1836 c 110
 Coroners (Ireland) Act 1836 c 89. Sometimes called the Coroners Act 1836.
 Countervailing Duties on Spirit Mixtures, etc. Act 1836 c 72
 Court of Chancery (Ireland) Act 1836 c 74
 Court of Exchequer, Equity Side Act 1836 c 112
 Court of Exchequer (Scotland) Act 1836 c 73
 Customs Act 1836 c 60
 Demise of Parts of Rolls Estate Act 1836 c 49
 Dublin Police Act 1836 c 29
 Durham (County Palatine) Act 1836 c 19
 Duties on Offices and Pensions Act 1836 c 97
 Ecclesiastical Appointments Suspension Act 1836 c 67
 Ecclesiastical Commissioners Act 1836 c 77
 Ecclesiastical Leases Act 1836 c 20
 Ecclesiastical Leases (Amendment) Act 1836 c 64
 Entail Powers Act 1836 c 42
 Erasures in Deeds (Scotland) Act 1836 c 33
 Exchequer Bills Act 1836 c 2
 Exchequer Bills Act 1836 c 113
 Excise Act 1836 c 52
 Executions for Murder Act 1836 c 30
 Forest of Dean Act 1836 c 3
 Game Laws (England); Local Taxes, etc. (Scotland) Act 1836 c 65
 Government Offices Security Act 1836 c 28
 Grand Jury (Ireland) Act 1836 c 116
 Greek Loan Guarantee Act 1836 c 94
 Highway Rates Act 1836 c 63
 Holyhead Road Act 1836 or the London and Holyhead Road Act 1836 c 35
 Horse Patrol, Metropolis Act 1836 c 50
 Inclosure Act 1836 c 115
 Indemnity Act 1836 c 7
 Indemnity to Certain Governors Act 1836 c 48
 Insolvent Debtors, East Indies Act 1836 c 47
 Insolvent Debtors (England) Act 1836 c 44
 Insolvent Debtors (Ireland) Act 1836 c 23
 Judicial Ratifications (Scotland) Act 1836 c 43
 Kingstown Harbour Act 1836 c 117
 Land Tax Commissioners (Appointment) Act 1836 c 80
 Letter Stealing (Scotland) Act 1836 c 21
 Liberties Act 1836 c 87
 Licensing (Ireland) Act 1836 c 38
 Lighthouses Act 1836 c 79
 Loan Societies (Ireland) Act 1836 c 55
 Lotteries Act 1836 c 66
 Marine Mutiny Act 1836 c 9
 Marriage Act 1836 c 85
 Marriages in St. Anne's Chapel, Wandsworth Act 1836 c 24
 Marriages in St. Clements, Oxford Act 1836 c 92
 Militia Ballots Suspension Act 1836 c 88
 Militia Pay Act 1836 c 93
 Municipal Corporations (Ireland) Act 1836 c 100
 Mutiny Act 1836 c 8
 New South Wales, etc. Act 1836 c 46
 Offences near Cape of Good Hope Act 1836 c 57
 Officers of Clerks of the Crown and Clerks of the Peace (Ireland) Act 1836 c 34
 Officers of the Exchequer (Ireland) Act 1836 c 83
 Parliamentary Elections Act 1836 c 101
 Parliamentary Elections Act 1836 c 102
 Parochial Assessments Act 1836 c 96
 Payment of Creditors (Scotland) Act 1836 c 90
 Petty Sessional Divisions Act 1836 c 12
 Plate (Scotland) Act 1836 c 69
 Poor Relief (Loans) Act 1836 c 107
 Postage Act 1836 c 25
 Post Office, Newspapers Act 1836 c 54
 Previous Conviction Act 1836 c 111
 Prince of Wales Island Act 1836 c 53
 Prints and Engravings Copyright (Ireland) Act 1836 c 59
 Public Works (Ireland) Act 1836 c 108
 Registration of Aliens Act 1836 c 11
 Richmond Penitentiary, etc. Act 1836 c 51
 Road from Sunk Island to Ottringham Act 1836 c 91
 Seamen Act 1836 c 15
 Shipowners' Liability for Losses by Fire Act 1836 c 61
 Sites for Schoolrooms Act 1836 c 70
 Slave Trade Act 1836 c 81
 Slave Trade, Suppression, Treaty with Spain Act 1836 c 6
 Stafford Election Act 1836 c 10
 Stamp Duties on Newspapers Act 1836 c 76
 Stamps and Excise Act 1836 c 45
 Stannaries Act 1836 c 106
 Sugar Duties Act 1836 c 26
 Supply Act 1836 c 1
 Supply Act 1836 c 18
 Tithe Act 1836 c 71
 Tithe Compositions (Ireland) Act 1836 c 95
 Trials for Felony Act 1836 c 114
 Turnpike Acts Continuance Act 1836 c 62
 Turnpike Acts, Ireland, Continuance Act 1836 c 40
 Valuation of Lands (Ireland) Act 1836 c 84
 Western Australia Government Act 1836 c 68

1837

7 Will. 4 & 1 Vict.

1 & 2 Vict.

 Abolition of Slavery Act 1837 c 3
 Civil List Act 1837 c 2
 Commissions of the Peace Continuance Act 1837 c 1
 Conveyance of Prisoners (Ireland) Act 1837 c 6
 Declaration by Quakers, etc. Act 1837 c 5
 Houses of Parliament Act 1837 c 7
 Quarter Sessions Act 1837 c 4

1838 (1 & 2 Vict.)

 Abolition of Slavery Act 1838 c 19
 Administration of Justice, New South Wales, etc. Act 1838 c 50
 Advances for Public Works Act 1838 c 88
 Appropriation Act 1838 c 111
 Arms and Gunpowder (Ireland) Act 1838 c 71
 Bank of Ireland Advances Act 1838 c 81
 Bread (Ireland) Act 1838 c 28
 Chancery Court Act 1838 c 54
 Church Building Act 1838 c 107
 Common Law Procedure Act 1838 c 45
 County Dublin Baronies Act 1838 c 115
 County Institutions (Ireland) Act 1838 c 116. Sometimes called the County Institution (Ireland) Act 1838.
 County of Clare Treasurer Act 1838 c 104
 County Treasurers (Ireland) Act 1838 c 53
 Court of Session (No. 1) Act 1838 c 86. Sometimes called the Court of Session Act 1838.
 Court of Session (No. 2) Act 1838 c 118
 Courts of Common Law, Sittings Act 1838 c 32
 Criminal Lunatics Act 1838 c 14
 Criminal Lunatics (Ireland) Act 1838 c 27
 Customs Act 1838 c 113
 Dean Forest (Encroachments) Act 1838 c 42
 Dean Forest (Mines) Act 1838 c 43
 Debt of City of Edinburgh, etc. Act, 1838 c 55
 Debtors (Scotland) Act 1838 c 114
 Declarations by Quakers, etc., on Acceptance of Offices Act 1838 c 15
 Dublin Police District Act 1838 c 63
 Duchess of Kent's Annuity Act 1838 c 8
 Duchies of Lancaster and Cornwall (Accounts) Act 1838 c 101
 Drouly Fund Act 1838 c 89
 Ecclesiastical Appointments Suspension Act 1838 c 108
 Entail Act 1838 c 70
 Estates Vest in Heirs, etc., of Mortgages Act 1838 c 69
 Exchequer Bills Act 1838 c 12
 Exchequer Bills Act 1838 c 26
 Exchequer Bills Act 1838 c 93
 Fines, etc. (Ireland) Act 1838 c 99
 Fires Prevention Act 1838 c 75
 Forms of Pleading Act 1838 c 100
 Four and a Half per Cent, Duties Repeal Act 1838 c 92
 Gibraltar Lighthouse, etc. Act 1838 c 66
 Glass Duties Act 1838 c 44
 Government Annuities Act 1838 c 49
 Government Offices Security Act 1838 c 61
 Grand Jury Cess Dublin Act 1838 c 51
 Grand Jury (Ireland) Act 1838 c 37
 Hackney Carriages, Metropolis Act 1838 c 79
 Haileybury College Act 1838 c 22
 Highland Schools Act 1838 c 87
 House of Commons Qualification Act 1838 c 48
 Indemnity Act 1838 c 16
 Indemnity to Certain Persons Act 1838 c 112
 Inland Fisheries (Ireland) Act 1838 c 76
 International Copyright Act 1838 c 59
 Joint Stock Banks Act 1838 c 96
 Judgments Act 1838 c 110
 Kingstown and Dublin Harbours Act 1838 c 36
 Land Tax Commissioners (Appointment) Act 1838 c 57
 Land Tax Redemption Act 1838 c 58
 Linen Manufacturers, etc. (Ireland) Act 1838 c 52
 Loan Societies (Ireland) Act 1838 c 78
 Local Commissioners Relief Act 1838 c 65
 Lower Canada Government Act 1838 c 9
 Lunatics Act 1838 c 73
 Marine Mutiny Act 1838 c 18
 Militia Ballots Suspension Act 1838 c 90
 Militia Pay Act 1838 c 91
 Municipal Corporations (Ireland) Act 1838 c 103
 Mutiny Act 1838 c 17
 Oaths Act 1838 c 105
 Parkhurst Prison Act 1838 c 82
 Parliamentary Boroughs (England), Stamp Duty Act 1838 c 35
 Parsonages Act 1838 c 23
 Parsonages (Amendment) Act 1838 c 29
 Party Processions (Ireland) Act 1838 c 34
 Pensions Act 1838 c 95
 Pluralities Act 1838 c 106
 Poor Relief (Ireland) Act 1838 c 56
 Poor Relief (Loans) Act 1838 c 25
 Postage Act 1838 c 97
 Private Bill Deposits Act 1838 c 117
 Public Record Office Act 1838 c 94
 Quakers and Moravians Act 1838 c 77
 Queen Anne's Bounty Act 1838 c 20
 Railways (Conveyance of Mails) Act 1838 c 98
 Regency Act Amendment Act 1838 c 24
 Renewal of Leases (Ireland) Act 1838 c 62
 Sale of Church Patronages Belonging to Municipal Corporations Act 1838 c 31
 Sheriff Courts (Scotland) Act 1838 c 119
 Slave Trade Suppression Act 1838 c 47
 Slave Trade Suppression Act 1838 c 102
 Slave Trade Treaties Act 1838 c 39
 Slave Trade Treaties Act 1838 c 40
 Slave Trade Treaties Act 1838 c 41
 Slave Trade Treaties Act 1838 c 83
 Slave Trade Treaties Act 1838 c 84
 Small Tenements Recovery Act 1838 c 74
 Sodor and Man Act 1838 c 30
 South Australia Government Act 1838 c 60 (unofficial short name for "An act to amend an act of the fourth and fifth years of his late majesty empowering his majesty to erect South Australia into a British province or provinces", an amendment to South Australia Act 1834)
 Special Constables Act 1838 c 80
 Stamps Act 1838 c 85
 Sugar Duties Act 1838 c 33
 Supply Act 1838 c 11
 Supply Act 1838 c 21
 Tin Duties Act 1838 c 120
 Tithe Act 1838 c 64
 Tithe Rentcharge (Ireland) Act 1838 c 109
 Turnpike Acts Continuance Act 1838 c 68
 Turnpike Acts (Ireland) Act 1838 c 72
 Vagrancy Act 1838 c 38
 Validity of Certain Contracts Act 1838 c 10
 Waterfront House of Industry Act 1838 c 13
 Western Australia Government Act 1838 c 46
 West Indian Prisons Act 1838 c 67

1839 (2 & 3 Vict.)

Public General Acts
 Appointments in Cathedral Churches Act 1839 c 14
 Appropriation Act 1839 c 89
 Archbishops', etc., House of Residence Act 1839 c 18
 Assaults (Ireland) Act 1839 c 77
 Assessed Taxes, etc. Act 1839 c 35
 Assizes Act 1839 c 72
 Bank of Ireland Advances Act 1839 c 91
 Bankruptcy Act 1839 c 29
 Bankruptcy (Scotland) Act 1839 c 41
 Bastard Children Act 1839 c 85
 Birmingham Police Act 1839 c 88
 Bolton Police Act 1839 c 95
 Borough Courts (England) Act 1839 c 27
 Borough Watch Rates Act 1839 c 28
 British Museum Act 1839 c 10
 Church Building Act 1839 c 49
 Constabulary (Ireland) Act 1839 c 75
 Copyright of Designs Act 1839 c 13
 Copyright of Designs Act 1839 c 17
 Counties (Detached Parts) Act 1839 c 82
 County Police Act 1839 c 93
 Court of Pleas of Durham Act 1839 c 16
 Court of Session Act 1839 c 36
 Courts of Judicature, India Act 1839 c 34
 Crown Land (Windsor) Act 1839 c 20
 Custody of Infants Act 1839 c 54
 Debts Recovery Act 1839 c 60
 Dublin Police Act 1839 c 78
 Duke of Marlborough's Annuity Act 1839 c 94
 Duties on Bricks Act 1839 c 24
 Duties on Glass Act 1839 c 25
 Duties on Paper Act 1839 c 23
 Duties on Soap Act 1839 c 63
 Duty on Stage Carriages Act 1839 c 66
 Ecclesiastical Preferments (England) Act 1839 c 55
 Election Petitions Act 1839 c 38
 Episcopal Jurisdiction (England) Act 1839 c 9
 Estates of Duke of Wellington Act 1839 c 4
 Exchequer Act 1839 c 90
 Exchequer Bills Act 1839 c 8
 Fines and Penalties (Ireland) Act 1839 c 92
 Fisheries, Convention with France Act 1839 c 96
 Highway (Railway Crossings) Act 1839 c 45
 Highway Rates Act 1839 c 81
 Highways Act 1839 c 40
 Insolvent Debtors Act 1839 c 39
 Joint Stock Banking Companies Act 1839 c 68
 Judges' Lodgings Act 1839 c 69
 Judgments Act 1839 c 11
 Juries (Ireland) Act 1839 c 48
 Justices of Assize Act 1839 c 22
 London Roads Act 1839 c 80
 Lower Canada Government Act 1839 c 53
 Manchester Police Act 1839 c 87
 Marine Mutiny Act 1839 c 7
 Metropolitan Police Act 1839 c 47
 Metropolitan Police Courts Act 1839 c 71
 Militia Ballots Suspension Act 1839 c 43
 Militia Officers Act 1839 c 59
 Militia Pay Act 1839 c 64
 Municipal Corporations (Ireland) Act 1839 c 76
 Mutiny Act 1839 c 5
 National Debt Act 1839 c 97
 New South Wales and Van Diemen's Land Act 1839 c 70
 Patents Act 1839 c 67
 Pensions Act 1839 c 51
 Poor Law Commission Act 1839 c 83
 Poor Rate Act 1839 c 84
 Poor Relief (Ireland) Act 1839 c 1
 Postage Act 1839 c 52
 Printers and Publishers Act 1839 c 12
 Prisons Act 1839 c 56
 Prisons (Scotland) Act 1839 c 42
 Public Works (Ireland) Act 1839 c 50
 Revival of Expired Laws, etc., Jamaica Act 1839 c 26
 Rogue Money (Scotland) Act 1839 c 65
 Sale of Spirits, etc. (Ireland) Act 1839 c 79
 Shannon Navigation Act 1839 c 61
 Slave Trade Suppression Act 1839 c 57
 Slave Trade Suppression Act 1839 c 73
 Soap Duties Act 1839 c 32
 Solicitors (Clerks) Act 1839 c 33
 Spiritual Duties Act 1839 c 30
 Stables at Windsor Castle Act 1839 c 20
 Staffordshire Potteries Stipendiary Justice Act 1839 c 15
 Stannaries Act 1839 c 58
 Sugar Duties Act 1839 c 21
 Supply Act 1839 c 2
 Supply Act 1839 c 6
 Timber Ships, British North America Act 1839 c 44
 Tithe Act 1839 c 62
 Tithe Arrears (Ireland) Act 1839 c 3
 Turnpike Acts Continuance Act 1839 c 31
 Turnpike Tolls Act 1839 c 46
 Unlawful Societies (Ireland) Act 1839 c 74
 Usury Act 1839 c 37
 Waterford Hospital Act 1839 c 19

See also
List of Acts of the Parliament of the United Kingdom

External links
- 60 George III & 1 George IV - 1820 - 1 George IV - 1820
- 1 & 2 George IV - 1821
- 3 George IV - 1822 - also
- Volume 63 - 4 George IV - 1823
- Volume 64 - 5 George IV - 1824
- 6 George IV - 1825
- Volume 66 - 7 George IV - 1826
- Volume 67 - 7 & 8 George IV - 1827 -  also
- 9 George IV - 1828
- 10 George IV - 1829 - - 7 & 8 George IV to 10 George IV - 1827-29
- 11 George IV and 1 William IV - 1830 - also
- Volume 71 - 1 William IV - 1831
- Volume 72 - 2 & 3 William IV - 1832
- 3 & 4 William IV - 1833
Volume 74 - 4 & 5 William IV - 1834 - different edition
- 5 & 6 William IV - 1835  - different edition - also
- 6 & 7 William IV - 1836 -  - different edition
 - 7 William IV & 1 Victoria - 1837 - different edition
- 1 & 2 Victoria - 1837-8 - different edition
- Volume 79 - 2 & 3 Victoria - 1839

Local Acts
 City of London Police Act 1839 c. xciv

References

1820
1820s in the United Kingdom
1830s in the United Kingdom